Coudert may refer to:

Coudert (surname)
Coudert Brothers, a New York law firm

See also
Lurquin-Coudert, a French automobile
Rapp-Coudert Committee, a New York State Legislature committee